Human Pathology is a monthly peer-reviewed medical journal covering pathology in humans. It was established in 1970 and is  published by Saunders. The editor-in-chief is Dr. Lori Erickson. According to the Journal Citation Reports, the journal has a 2016 impact factor of 3.014.

References

External links 
 

Elsevier academic journals
Monthly journals
English-language journals
Pathology journals
Publications established in 1970